The 1980–81 FIRA Trophy was the 21st edition of a European rugby union championship for national teams.

The tournament was won by Romania, who achieved a Grand Slam, defeating all their opponents. Romania had a memorable 15–0 win over France at 23 November 1980, in Bucharest.

First division 
Table

Spain and Poland relegated to division 2

Results

Second division 
Table

Germany Promoted to division 1

Yugoslavia relegated to division 3

Results

Third division 
Table

Portugal promoted to division 2

Results

Bibliography 
 Francesco Volpe, Valerio Vecchiarelli (2000), 2000 Italia in Meta, Storia della nazionale italiana di rugby dagli albori al Sei Nazioni, GS Editore (2000) .
 Francesco Volpe, Paolo Pacitti (Author), Rugby 2000, GTE Gruppo Editorale (1999).

References

External links
 FIRA-AER official website

1980–81 in European rugby union
1980-81
1981 rugby union tournaments for national teams
1980 rugby union tournaments for national teams